Parag Alavani is an Indian politician and member of the Bharatiya Janata Party.

Constituency
Parag Alavani was elected from the Vile Parle Assembly Constituency in Mumbai, to Maharashtra Vidhan Sabha in 2014 and 2019.

Positions held 
 Maharashtra Legislative Assembly MLA.
 Terms in office: 2014–2019.

References 

Maharashtra MLAs 2014–2019
Living people
Bharatiya Janata Party politicians from Maharashtra
Politicians from Mumbai
Maharashtra politicians
Year of birth missing (living people)